I See You is a 2019 American horror thriller film directed by Adam Randall from a screenplay by Devon Graye. The film stars Helen Hunt, Jon Tenney, and Judah Lewis.

I See You premiered at the 2019 SXSW Film Festival and was released on December 6, 2019, to generally positive reviews.

Plot
Ten-year-old Justin Whitter is abducted while riding his bicycle through a park. Greg Harper is made lead detective on the case, assisted by Detective Spitzky. A green pocket knife is found at the scene, connecting the crime to a series of abductions committed 15 years prior by a man named Cole Gordon, who is now in prison. Greg's family life is in ruins after his wife Jackie had an affair. Their only child, Connor, remains deeply resentful towards her since he learned of the affair.

Greg and Spitzky are called in by the chief. She informs them that Cole is pushing for a mistrial in light of the new abductions. They go to speak with Braun, one of Cole's two surviving victims, but he becomes hysterical when he sees them. Mysterious events start to occur in the Harper house: silverware goes missing, a television turns on by itself, pictures are removed from their frames, a repairman tells Jackie he was let in by her daughter, and Greg is trapped in a closet.

Jackie is visited by her former lover, Todd, who is intent on continuing the affair. After he is hit in the head by a mug that Jackie assumes Conner threw from upstairs, she hides Todd in the basement and takes Connor to school. Todd is attacked by an unknown assailant and Jackie returns home to find him dead. She panics, assuming Connor has killed him. She and Greg bury his body.

Back at home, Connor hears a clanging noise coming from the utility room and discovers the missing silverware wrapped in clothing in the washing machine. He then receives a bizarre message on his computer as a person wearing a mask appears behind him. Greg and Jackie return home to find Connor tied up in the bathtub, with a green pocket knife next to him. Jackie takes Connor to the hospital while Greg searches the house.

The film jumps back in time and reveals that the mysterious happenings in the house were being caused by two homeless people, Mindy and Alec, who have been "phrogging" (hiding in houses unbeknownst to the owners) in the Harper home. Mindy is experienced and tries to keep a low profile so that she never gets caught, but Alec decides he wants to make the family believe they are going insane. Mindy witnesses Greg killing Todd and goes to alert Alec, only to see him tying Connor up. She tells Alec she is calling the police, but he pushes her down the stairs, rendering her unconscious. Alec then hides her in Greg's car. After Jackie leaves to take Connor to the hospital, Greg drives away his car, unknowingly taking Mindy with him.

Mindy awakens in the trunk of the car. She searches Greg's bag and finds multiple green pocket knives and Justin's shirt, revealing Greg is the kidnapper. When he parks in the forest, Mindy sneaks out and tries to call 911 to no avail. She comes across an old trailer where Justin and Michael are trapped. As she tries to free them, Greg ambushes her, takes her back to his house, and shoots her dead. Alec attacks Greg, disarming him. Greg knocks Alec out, then stabs himself to make it seem like he's been attacked.

Alec recovers consciousness, grabs Greg's gun, and kills him. Spitzky arrives and shoots Alec in the shoulder. Alec says Spitzky's name and Spitzky recognizes him. Jackie and Connor arrive home to find it swarming with police. Spitzky discovers the bag of evidence in Greg's car and the two boys are rescued from the trailer. As Alec is carried to an ambulance, flashbacks show a younger Alec and Braun encountering Greg, implying that Alec was the other surviving child.

Cast
 Helen Hunt as Jackie Harper
 Jon Tenney as Greg Harper
 Owen Teague as Alec
 Judah Lewis as Connor Harper
 Libe Barer as Mindy
 Gregory Alan Williams as Spitzky
 Erika Alexander as Lieutenant Moriah Davis
 Allison King as Officer Grace Caleb
 Adam Kern as Window Repairman
 Jeremy Gladen as Tommy Braun
 Teri Clark as Mrs. Braun
 Nicole Forester as Mrs. Whitter

Sam Trammell makes an uncredited appearance as Todd.

Production

Helen Hunt joined the cast in June 2017. Principal photography took place in May 2018 around Chagrin Falls, Cleveland and Lakewood, Ohio.

Release
The film had its world premiere at the SXSW Film Festival, in the Midnighters section, on March 13, 2019. It was released in theaters by Saban Films on December 6, 2019,  and on VOD by Cinema Epoch Video on December 3, 2019.

Reception

Box office
I See You grossed $1.1 million worldwide, against a production budget of $5 million.

Critical response
The site's consensus reads: "I See You gets tripped up on its own narrative contortions, but a solid cast and an effective blend of scares and suspense make this slow-building mystery worth watching." On Metacritic, the film has a weighted average score of 65 out of 100, based on 8 critics, indicating "generally favorable reviews".

Dennis Harvey in Variety described the film as "an eerie suspense exercise that starts out looking like a supernatural tale — one of several viewer presumptions this cleverly engineered narrative eventually pulls the rug out from under." Stephen Dalton of The Hollywood Reporter stated, "I See You is such a finely crafted exercise in slow-burn suspense that its loopy plot contortions only seem absurd in retrospect," and elaborated, "actor turned first-time screenwriter Devon Graye's tricksy script keeps audiences on their toes with all this multi-viewpoint misdirection, so much so that most will be caught off-guard by further major reveals."

References

External links
 
 

2019 films
2019 horror films
2019 thriller films
2019 thriller drama films
2010s horror drama films
American horror drama films
American horror thriller films
American thriller films
American thriller drama films
Films about missing people
Films shot in Cleveland
Films shot in Ohio
Saban Films films
Squatting in film
2010s English-language films
2010s American films